Ann Savoy (born Ann Allen on January 20, 1952) is a musician, author, and record producer.

Biography
Savoy was raised in Richmond, Virginia. She resides with her husband Marc Savoy and family in Eunice, Southern Louisiana.

As a musician, she performs with her husband accordionist Marc Savoy and fiddler Michael Doucet in the Savoy Doucet Cajun Band. She also has an all-woman band The Magnolia Sisters. She also performs with husband Marc and their sons, Joel and Wilson, in the Savoy Family Band. Most recently, she has put together a Django Reinhardt-style swing band called Ann Savoy and her Sleepless Knights.

Savoy appeared as a musician in the film Divine Secrets of the Ya-Ya Sisterhood and was the associate music director of the film All The King's Men, working on this project with T Bone Burnett. She has appeared in many documentaries on the subject of Cajun music including a Les Blank film, entitled Marc and Ann.

As a record producer she produced, among others, the Grammy Award nominated tribute to Cajun music, Evangeline Made: A Tribute to Cajun Music, featuring singers Linda Ronstadt, John Fogerty, Nick Lowe, herself, and other noted musicians.

She is the editor and compiler of Cajun Music: A Reflection of a People, which chronicles the history of Cajun and Zydeco music. Volume one was published in 1984, and volume two will be released in December 2020. Savoy had put the project on hold while she raised four children and pursued a music career, but the downtime forced by the COVID-19 pandemic plus the encouragement of her grown children allowed her to complete volume two in 2020. Volume one garnered the American Folklore Society's Botkin Book Award, and the documentary film J'etais au bal was based in part on the book.

She has recorded a number of albums. As The Zozo Sisters, she recorded with Linda Ronstadt the Grammy Award-nominated and Billboard-charting CD Adieu False Heart.  That album is notable for being Savoy's first time recording in English.

Discography

Ann Savoy and Her Sleepless Knights
 If Dreams Come True (2007) Memphis Records
 Black Coffee (2009) Memphis Records

With Savoy Doucet Cajun Band
 Home Music with Spirits (1981) Arhoolie Records
 Savoy-Doucet Cajun Band (1984) Arhoolie Records
 With Spirits (1987) Arhoolie Records
 J'ai Ete au Bal: I Went to the Dance various artists (1989) Arhoolie Records
 J'ai Ete au Bal: I Went to the Dance video (DVD); various artists (1989) Arhoolie Records
 Two Step D'Amadé (1993) Arhoolie Records
 Les Harias: Home Music (1993) Arhoolie Records
 Live! (1994) Arhoolie Records
 Cajun Country video (DVD); various artists (1995) Shanachie
 Aly Meets The Cajuns video (DVD); Aly Bain and others (1998) Whirlie Records
 Sam's Big Rooster (2000) Arhoolie Records
 Best of the Savoy Doucet Cajun Band (2002) Arhoolie Records

Magnolia Sisters
 Prends Courage (1995) Arhoolie Records
 Chers Amis (2000) Rounder Records
 Après Faire Le Boogie Woogie (2004) Rounder
 Stripped Down (2009) Arhoolie Records

Savoy Family Band

 Savoy Family Album (2003) Arhoolie Records
 Turn Loose But Don't Let Go (2008) Arhoolie Records
 Live at the 2013 New Orleans Jazz & Heritage Festival (2013) New Orleans Jazz Fest

With others
The Rough Guide to Cajun & Zydeco Various Artists (1999) World Music Network
Evangeline Made: A Tribute to Cajun Music Various artists, including and produced by Ann Savoy (2002) Vanguard Records
Adieu False Heart with Linda Ronstadt as the Zozo Sisters (2006) Vanguard Records
Allons Boire un Coup: A Collection of Cajun and Creole Drinking Songs Ann and Joel Savoy; Ann Savoy and Jane Vidrine – various artists (2006) Valcour Records
 I Wanna Sing Right: Rediscovering Lomax in the Evangeline Country four-EP set – various artists (2015) Valcour Records
 Fais Do Do: Louisiana Lullabies Ann Savoy and Jane Vidrine (2019) Valcour Records

References

External links

 
 Marc and Ann Savoy
 Savoy Music Center
 PBS American Roots Music

1952 births
Living people
American folk singers
American folk musicians
Cajun musicians
American women singers
American music historians
Record producers from Virginia
Musicians from Richmond, Virginia
American women historians
Singers from Louisiana
Vanguard Records artists
Rounder Records artists
American women record producers
Historians from Virginia
21st-century American women